Kremyonki is a town in Zhukovsky District of Kaluga Oblast, Russia. Population:

History
Town status was granted to Kremyonki on December 29, 2004.

Administrative and municipal status
Within the framework of administrative divisions, Kremyonki is subordinated to Zhukovsky District. As a municipal division, the town of Kremyonki is incorporated within Zhukovsky Municipal District as Kremyonki Urban Settlement.

References

Notes

Sources

Cities and towns in Kaluga Oblast
Tarussky Uyezd